Amy Elik is a Republican member of the Illinois House from the 111th district since January 13, 2021. The 111th district, located in the Metro East, includes all or parts of Alton, Bethalto, East Alton, Edwardsville, Elsah, Godfrey, Granite City, Hartford, Holiday Shores, Madison, Mitchell, Pontoon Beach, Rosewood Heights, Roxana, South Roxana, and Wood River.

Elik was elected to the 111th district after defeating Democratic incumbent Monica Bristow in the 2020 Illinois House of Representatives election by a nine-point margin.

Early life, education, and career
Elik has been a "lifelong resident of Madison County". After graduating from the University of Illinois Urbana-Champaign, she became a Certified Public Accountant and an auditor. She previously served as a Foster Township trustee from April 2013 to December 2020. She previously served on the school board for St. Mary's Catholic School in Alton. She has "been a member of the Rotary Club of the Riverbend and involved in the Fosterburg AG 4H Club as a co-leader." She previously "served as a volunteer and teacher with SCORE."

As of July 3, 2022, Representative Elik is a member of the following Illinois House committees:

 Appropriations - Human Services Committee (HAPH)
 Elementary & Secondary Education: School Curriculum & Policies Committee (HELM)
 Energy & Environment Committee (HENG)
 Income Tax Subcommittee (HREF-INTX)
 Labor & Commerce Committee (HLBR)
 Transportation: Regulation, Roads & Bridges (HTRR)
 Workforce Development Subcommittee (HLBR-WORK)

Issues 
Elik supports gun rights. She opposes abortion.

Electoral history

Personal life
Elik currently resides in Fosterburg, Illinois with her husband Don and her two children, Caroline and Adam. She and Don have been married since 1997. She and her family are a member of St. Mary's Parish and attend St. Mary's Catholic Church in Alton, Illinois.

References

External links
Representative Amy Elik (R) at the Illinois General Assembly
Constituent Website

21st-century American politicians
21st-century American women politicians
American Roman Catholics
Catholics from Illinois
Living people
Democratic Party members of the Illinois House of Representatives
Women state legislators in Illinois
Year of birth missing (living people)